Mia Blichfeldt (born 19 August 1997) is a Danish badminton player. She won the gold medals at the 2015 European Junior Championships in the girls' singles event, and later at the 2019 Minsk European Games in the women's singles event.

Career summary 

Blichfeldt started to play badminton in Solrød Strand badmintonclub at the age of nine, and began playing competitively at the age of eleven. She made her international debut in 2013, representing her country at the 2013, 2014, 2015 World Junior Championships, and 2014 Summer Youth Olympics. She won the gold medal at the 2015 European Junior Championships in the girls' singles event, also helping her team take the bronze.

At the age of sixteen, she claimed her first international title at the 2013 Norwegian International, beating top seed Olga Golovanova of Russia in the final. In 2014, she won the Danish National Championships.

In 2017, she reached the final of the Scottish Open, but lost in the final to host player Kirsty Gilmour with a score of 21–23, 12–21.

In 2018, Blichfeldt reached the semi-finals of the European Championships, but was stopped by the host player and 2016 Olympic gold medallist Carolina Marin, thus having to settle for a bronze medal. At the same year, she won her first Super 100 title at the Dutch Open, when she defeated Qi Xuefei with a score of 21–16, 21–18.

In 2019, Blichfeldt won the Spain Masters, a Super 300 tournament, by beating compatriot Line Kjærsfeldt with a score of 21–14, 21–14 in the final. She clinched the gold at the 2019 Minsk European Games, defeating Scotland's Kirsty Gilmour with a score of 21–16, 21–17. At the 2019 BWF World Championships, she made her first-ever World Championship quarterfinal by beating eighth seed Saina Nehwal in the Round of 16. However, she lost in the quarterfinals to the Chinese fourth seed and eventual bronze medallist Chen Yufei.

In 2020, Blichfeldt along with the Denmark team won the 2020 European Women's Team Championships.

In 2021, Blichfeldt competed in the 2020 Tokyo Olympics, where she was seeded thirteenth. She topped her group in the Group Stage, beating Bulgaria's Linda Zetchiri and Australia's Chen Hsuan-yu, to make the Round of 16. However, she lost in the Round of 16 to the then reigning World Champion and eventual bronze medallist P. V. Sindhu of India.

Achievements

European Games 
Women's singles

European Championships 
Women's singles

European Junior Championships 
Girls' singles

BWF World Tour (2 titles, 2 runners-up) 
The BWF World Tour, announced on 19 March 2017 and implemented in 2018, is a series of elite badminton tournaments, sanctioned by Badminton World Federation (BWF). The BWF World Tour are divided into six levels, namely World Tour Finals, Super 1000, Super 750, Super 500, Super 300 (part of the HSBC World Tour), and the BWF Tour Super 100.

Women's singles

BWF Grand Prix (1 runner-up) 
The BWF Grand Prix has two levels, the BWF Grand Prix and Grand Prix Gold. It is a series of badminton tournaments sanctioned by the Badminton World Federation (BWF) since 2007.

Women's singles

  BWF Grand Prix Gold tournament
  BWF Grand Prix tournament

BWF International Challenge/Series (6 titles, 1 runner-up) 
Women's singles

  BWF International Challenge tournament
  BWF International Series tournament
  BWF Future Series tournament

Career overview

Record against selected opponents 
Record against Year-end Finals finalists, World Championships semi-finalists, and Olympic quarter-finalists. Accurate as of 6 November 2022.

References

External links 
 

1997 births
Living people
People from Solrød Municipality
Danish female badminton players
Badminton players at the 2014 Summer Youth Olympics
Badminton players at the 2019 European Games
European Games gold medalists for Denmark
European Games medalists in badminton
Badminton players at the 2020 Summer Olympics
Olympic badminton players of Denmark
Sportspeople from Region Zealand